Thomas Pearson McMillan (born 16 January 1936) was a Scottish footballer who played for Watford, Carlisle United, Queen of the South, Dumbarton and Stranraer.

References

1936 births
Scottish footballers
Dumbarton F.C. players
Stranraer F.C. players
Queen of the South F.C. players
Watford F.C. players
Carlisle United F.C. players
Scottish Football League players
Living people
Association football inside forwards